The BFI 75 Most Wanted is a list compiled in 2010 by the British Film Institute of the most sought-after British feature films not held in the BFI National Archive, and classified as "missing, believed lost".  The films chosen range from quota quickies and B-movies to lavish prestige productions of their day.  The list includes lost works by major directors and those featuring top-name actors; also films that were top box-office successes in their time but have since disappeared, and works that are believed to be historically significant for some aspect of style, technique, subject matter or innovation.

The earliest film on the list dates from 1913, the latest from 1983.  The 1930s is the most represented decade with 24 entries, followed by the 1920s (16) and the 1940s (14).  Maurice Elvey, with four films on the list, is the most represented director.  The first film on the list is Alfred Hitchcock's 1926 feature The Mountain Eagle, described as "the Holy Grail of film historians".

Since 2012, the BFI has revealed that a number of the films on the list have been found. As of 2017, 18 of the 75 films have been found in their complete form; two others exist in shortened, retitled versions that were re-edited for the United States market.

Films (in chronological order)

See also
 List of lost films

References

Lists of British films
Lost British films
Most Wanted